King's Bounty II is a turn-based tactical role-playing game developed by 1C Entertainment and published by Prime Matter that was released for Nintendo Switch, Microsoft Windows, PlayStation 4, and Xbox One on August 24, 2021. It is a direct sequel to the first King's Bounty game released in 1990, though a spin off title, King's Bounty: The Legend, that was also developed by 1C, was released in 2008. King's Bounty II was initially announced for Microsoft Windows, PlayStation 4, and Xbox One on August 14, 2019. The Nintendo Switch version was announced on March 26, 2020 in a Nintendo Direct Mini presentation.

You are thrown into the deep end of the sprawling open world that is the Kingdom of Nostria as it is plunged into political chaos in King's Bounty II.

Reception 
King's Bounty II received "mixed or average" reviews, according to review aggregator Metacritic.

References

External links

King's Bounty 2 at 1C Company official website

2021 video games
1C Company games
Nintendo Switch games
PlayStation 4 games
Single-player video games
Tactical role-playing video games
Unreal Engine games
Video games developed in Russia
Video game sequels
Windows games
Xbox One games